Scarlet Witch (Wanda Maximoff) is a character appearing in American comic books published by Marvel Comics. Created by writer Stan Lee and artist Jack Kirby, the character first appeared in The X-Men #4 (March 1964) in the Silver Age of Comic Books. Originally said to have the ability to alter probability, the Scarlet Witch has been depicted as a powerful sorceress since the 1980s and on occasion has become powerful enough to alter reality by tapping into greater energy sources.

The Scarlet Witch is first depicted as a reluctant supervillain along with her twin brother, Pietro Maximoff/Quicksilver, both founding members of the Brotherhood of Mutants. A year after her debut, she joined the Avengers superhero team and ever since has often been depicted as a regular member of that or related teams (such as the West Coast Avengers and Force Works). In 1975, she married her android teammate Vision, later using borrowed magical forces to make herself pregnant, resulting in twin sons William ("Billy") and Thomas (“Tommy”). Stories in 1989 wiped Tommy and Billy from existence (they would later reappear as the heroes called Wiccan and Speed) and removed Vision's emotions, leading to the annulment of his and Wanda's marriage.

For most of her comic book history, the Scarlet Witch is portrayed as a mutant, a member of a fictional subspecies of humans born with an "X-gene" that grants superhuman abilities and traits, although multiple stories also said the nature of her mutant powers were influenced by the High Evolutionary experimenting on her when she was a child. A 2015 storyline revised Wanda's origin, establishing that her superhuman traits are entirely a result of experimentation done by the High Evolutionary and on inherited magic abilities. Like Franklin Richards and other characters, her genetics were such that standard X-gene tests gave a false positive, meaning she was never actually born a mutant.

The character's in-universe backstory and parentage have changed more than once. During the 1960s, she and Quicksilver are said to be the mutant twin offspring of two unnamed parents. Later, it is said the children were given to the geneticist called the High Evolutionary, leaving their true parentage a mystery. In 1974, it is said their parents are Golden Age heroes Bob Frank / Whizzer and Madeline Joyce Frank / Miss America. Wanda then refers to herself as Wanda Frank for a time. In 1979, they are revealed to have been raised by human Romani parents, Django and Marya Maximoff. In 1982, Magneto concludes he is Wanda and Pietro's father. In 2014, the AXIS crossover revealed Pietro and Wanda are not related to Magneto. In 2015, the twins discover they are not mutants and their superhuman traits are the result of the High Evolutionary's experiments. The 2015–2017 Scarlet Witch series reveals Wanda and Pietro's adopted parents Django and Marya Maximoff are biologically their aunt and uncle. Their real mother is confirmed to be Natalya Maximoff, the previous Scarlet Witch, a sorceress whose father was the Scarlet Warlock.

The Scarlet Witch has been described as one of Marvel's most notable and powerful heroes.

Since 2014, Elizabeth Olsen has portrayed Wanda Maximoff in the Marvel Cinematic Universe.

Publication history

The Scarlet Witch and her twin brother Quicksilver debuted as a part of the Brotherhood of Evil Mutants in X-Men #4 (March 1964). They were depicted as reluctant villains, only wanting safety from persecution and uninterested in team leader Magneto's plans for global domination. The Scarlet Witch is depicted as calm and submissive, like many female comic book characters of the time. Her costume was composed of a bathing suit with straps, opera gloves, short boots, a leotard covering her body, a superhero cape, and a wimple, all of which were colored in shades of red. She was created by Stan Lee and Jack Kirby.

Lee and Kirby also produced the Avengers comic book, composed of Marvel's most prominent solo heroes at the time. Save for Captain America, Lee and Kirby eventually had all the Avengers leave to focus on their individual careers, replacing them with former villains from other comics who did not have a series of their own: the Scarlet Witch and Quicksilver from X-Men, and Hawkeye from Iron Man's adventures in Tales of Suspense. The team was known as "Cap's Kooky Quartet." Although common in later years, such a wide-scale change in the roster of a superhero group was completely unprecedented (usually, superhero teams only exchanged one or two members at a time rather than almost the entire roster at once). Lee and the following Avengers writer, Roy Thomas, hinted that other Avengers were romantically interested in the Scarlet Witch. The twins later leave the team after a crossover with the X-Men.

Some years later, Thomas brought Wanda and Pietro back into the team and started a long-running romantic relationship between the Scarlet Witch and the android hero Vision, thinking it would help with the series' character development. He elected those characters because they were only published in the Avengers comic book and did not star in solo adventures, so relationship drama in the series would not interfere with stories in other publications. Their first kiss took place during the Kree–Skrull War arc. Thomas also added Hawkeye into a love triangle with both characters, eventually having the archer realize that Vision and Wanda were truly in love. A fan of Golden Age heroes, Roy Thomas often found ways to integrate the older characters into modern-day stories. In Giant-Size Avengers #1 (August 1974), Quicksilver and the Scarlet Witch are revealed to be the children of Golden Age superheroes Whizzer (Robert Frank) and Miss America (Madeline Joyce).

Steve Englehart succeeded Thomas as the writer of Avengers. He gave Wanda a more assertive personality and removed the highly-protective Quicksilver from the team. In 1974, Englehart expanded Wanda's powers by having her learn witchcraft from Agatha Harkness. The Vision and the Scarlet Witch married in Giant-Size Avengers #4 (June 1975), the end of the Celestial Madonna story arc. In 1979, Wanda learns Bob Frank and Madeline Joyce are not her and Pietro's parents. Wanda then stars in the 4-issue limited series The Vision and the Scarlet Witch (1982–83), by writer Bill Mantlo and penciler Rick Leonardi. In this limited series, Magneto was retconned to be Wanda and Pietro's father. Englehart returned to the characters with penciler Richard Howell for a second limited series, in which the Scarlet Witch gets pregnant by magical means and delivers twin sons, William and Thomas. Englehart took over as writer for the spin-off series West Coast Avengers, later adding Vision and Wanda to the team.

John Byrne later replaced Englehart on the series (which was renamed Avengers West Coast). He wrote and illustrated the controversial "Vision Quest" storyline, where the Vision is dismantled and turned into an emotionless being who later even refuses the chance to regain his emotions (leading to the annulment of his marriage to the Scarlet Witch). After this, Byrne retconned William and Thomas to be magical constructs created by Wanda experiencing a "hysterical" pregnancy and then subconsciously using her magic to create the children. At most, Wanda's magic should have only created illusions, but the twins were seemingly given life because Wanda unknowingly empowered them with pieces of the essence of the demon lord Mephisto. Mephisto later absorbs the children into himself, creating a bond to Wanda's magic and soul. To sever the connection, Agatha Harkness removes Wanda's memory of the children. Around this same time, Wanda is brainwashed twice by different villains, first to become a servant for the parasitic life form That Which Endures and then to be a "Bride of Set" during the crossover Atlantis Attacks. Although her mind is restored both times, the repeated trauma renders her catatonic. At this time, the Vision decides he cannot help Wanda or the Avengers West Coast and returns to the NYC team.

Byrne's next storyline involved Wanda becoming a villain yet again, now displaying greater and more focused power than before, and rejoining Magneto. Writers Roy and Dann Thomas took over Avengers West Coast, and reveal Wanda's new personality, attacks on the Avengers, and increase in power were all due to manipulations by the time villain Immortus, who had been seen watching the Avengers during some of Byrne's issues. The storyline revealed Wanda is a "nexus being", a person who greatly affects timelines. By influencing Wanda to tap into her nexus energies, Immortus caused her increase in power and the creation of the children. Immortus wishes to use her to warp reality, but Wanda comes to her senses and gives up her nexus energies. Roy and Dann Thomas then revealed that a side effect of this caused Wanda to remember her children and temporarily lose her powers. The website Women in Refrigerators interviewed Englehart about these changes, who said he did not like them.

Multiple stories after the Immortus storyline featured Wanda remembering and mourning her children, and even judging teammate Spider-Woman for bringing her child along on an Avengers assignment. Roy Thomas later wrote the short story "A Study in Scarlet", with art by Al Bigley and Mike DeCarlo, published in Avengers West Coast Annual #7 (1992). The short story featured Wanda reflecting on how she was glad Agatha's memory-blocking spell only lasted a short time, as she appreciates having had the chance to mourn her children properly. She then accidentally creates a window into another timeline where she sees a version of events where she, Vision, and the children remained together. This brings her comfort and helps her feel she can cope with the loss better.

Following the Immortus storyline, Wanda is a more serious-minded character, wishing to atone for turning against the Avengers twice in a short amount of time and endangering reality. When she regains her powers, her hexes are initially more difficult to control and only on the power level she had when she first joined the Avengers. To compensate, she practices the magic Harkness taught her. In 1994, Avengers West Coast ended, and several of its team members reformed as an independent group led by Wanda in the series Force Works. The new title ran for only a couple of years. In 1994, a Scarlet Witch four-issue limited series was written by Andy Lanning and Dan Abnett, and pencilled by John Higgins.

Marvel Comics was nearing bankruptcy in 1996. The Avengers and other titles were relaunched in a new continuity and line of books called Heroes Reborn, outsourced to the studios of Image Comics artists. Rob Liefeld worked with the relaunched Avengers title and included the Scarlet Witch in the team, making her a sorceress with no mutant abilities (the Heroes Reborn reality did not make any reference to any people born with mutant powers). After Marvel renegotiated the terms of the deal, Liefeld was replaced with writer Walter Simonson and penciler Michael Ryan. The project was a success, boosting the sales of the titles and bringing Marvel Comics out of bankruptcy. The project ended after a year, and the Avengers were returned to the mainstream Marvel reality. The Avengers series relaunched again, now under Kurt Busiek and George Pérez. Pérez designed a new, complicated design for Wanda, increasing the volume of curls in her hair and giving her a costume with Romani influences. Pérez commented he preferred this more challenging design but accepted other artists would find it irksome. Later when he became the artist on Avengers, Alan Davis asked to change the design because it didn't work well with his simpler, less detailed style. During Busiek's stories, Wanda once again becomes a powerful sorceress by tapping into the energy of "chaos magic." Busiek clarifies her true mutant power is to tap into magical energy fields and manipulate them, just as Magneto taps into and manipulates electromagnetic fields.

Marvel decided to relaunch the Avengers series again, with a new roster, headquarters, atmosphere, and creative direction. To promote the change and gain reader interest, the inciting event was depicted in the 2004 story Avengers Disassembled written by Brian Michael Bendis and with art by David Finch. In the story, a remark by the Wasp causes Wanda to remember her children (how and when Wanda once again lost the memories of her children is not explained). She suddenly relives the trauma of their loss and feels betrayed by the Avengers, both for allowing Harkness to cloud her memories and for being unable to save her children from Mephisto. Emotionally overwhelmed and simultaneously experiencing a drastic increase in power, Wanda kills Agatha Harkness and causes the Avengers to suffer their "worst day" by altering the minds of She-Hulk and Iron Man, and causing simulations of the villain Ultron and the alien Kree to attack. This leads to the apparent deaths of different characters and the destruction of Avengers Mansion. Wanda is discovered to be the culprit and stopped, after which she falls into a coma. The Avengers disband, then reform in New Avengers. To explain her sudden increase in power, the sorcerer Dr. Strange says Wanda's actual mutant power is to reshape reality, adding that her talk of tapping into "chaos magic" is a lie because such a force does not exist. This contradicted earlier comics where Dr. Strange himself uses chaos magic and "catastrophe magic", and later Marvel stories confirm chaos magic is a real force that sorcerers can access.

Wanda was seen again in the limited series House of M, creating an alternate version of Earth. When Earth's heroes defeat her, she causes "M-Day," removing the powers of most mutants on Earth. She then appeared in the Young Avengers follow-up series, Avengers: The Children's Crusade (2010-2012), which retconned Avengers Disassembled by revealing Wanda's extreme actions and enhanced power levels during recent stories were the result of tapping into an enormous source of energy that then corrupted her, similar to when she was possessed by Chthon, brainwashed by That Which Endures, and corrupted by Immortus. This was now the explanation as to how she was able to warp reality and why she would no longer be that powerful, and partially exonerated her from her actions against the Avengers and during M-Day. Wanda was again portrayed as someone who wanted to atone for her past, accepting partial responsibility rather than completely blaming outside influences, allying herself with Doctor Doom. Avengers: The Children's Crusade also now referred to the children of William and Thomas not as "pieces" of Mephisto's essence but as "lost souls" who had been taken away by Mephisto, indicating they actually had been alive and explaining how they could be reincarnated as the teenage heroes Speed and Wiccan.

The Scarlet Witch is a regular character in Uncanny Avengers (2012), beginning with issue #1. The 2014 AXIS crossover retconned the character's parentage again, revealing Magneto is not biologically her father, contrary to that relationship's place in the canon for 32 years. In 2015, it was revealed in Uncanny Avengers (Vol. 2) #4 that she and Pietro are not mutants but humans who received superhuman genetics due to the experiments of the High Evolutionary. In Wanda's case, the High Evolutionary's genetic tampering made her more powerful in magic than she would have been otherwise. This plot twist was published while Marvel Studios and 20th Century Fox had a legal dispute over the film rights to the character. Fox had a film license for the X-Men, related characters, and most Marvel characters designated as mutants, while Marvel Studios was about to introduce Wanda and Pietro in the 2015 film Avengers: Age of Ultron.

Under the All-New, All-Different Marvel branding, the character received her own ongoing solo series from late 2015 to 2017, written by James Robinson and illustrated by a rotating team of artists. Robinson explained he was influenced by the work of Matt Fraction and David Aja on the Hawkeye title: "... they managed to stay true to the character in the Avengers while also taking it in a fresh direction, so it wasn't just that same Avengers character doing solo things, which I don't think ever really works for any sustained period of time for any of those second-tier characters." The 2015 Scarlet Witch series has Wanda investigating supernatural threats with Agatha Harkness at her side. During the series, she encounters the evil Declan Dane, the Emerald Warlock, who declares himself Wanda's arch-enemy. In issues #3 and #4, a journey through the mystical dimension known as the Witch's Road allows Wanda to meet the spirit of her true mother, a sorceress named Natalya Maximoff who also uses the title "Scarlet Witch." Wanda discovers her adopted parents are actually her biological aunt and uncle, and that her bloodline includes many magic-users who chose to identify with the color scarlet. Wanda realizes powerful sorcerers often identify with complex rather than basic or primary colors. Now feeling more secure in her identity, Wanda confidently returns to the role of superhero and resumes her association with the Avengers.

The aftermath of her murder during the Hellfire Gala (2021) was dealt with in the limited series X-Men: Trial of Magneto (2021); Scarlet Witch was resurrected in the second issue of the series. Writer Leah Williams commented that the intended focus of the series is on Scarlet Witch and rehabilitating "Wanda's image with the rest of the mutants on Krakoa"; Williams stated that "her goal is not to write the next defining Magneto story but to write an 'empathy engine', as a Wanda sympathiser, to authentically tell a story that's going to be about healing and catharsis". As part of her redemption arc, the Scarlet Witch updated the Krakoan Resurrection Protocols so that mutants who were not backed up by Mr. Sinister and Cerebro could now be resurrected. This added twenty million mutants to the queue, including everyone who died on Genosha, and led to the Scarlet Witch being called the Redeemer on Krakoa. In September 2022, Marvel announced a Scarlet Witch solo series which follows the events of Trial of Magneto; it premiered in January 2023.

Fictional character biography
Throughout the generations, different members of the Maximoff family, a Romani bloodline, are born with a strong talent for magic. Several members of the family associate their magic with scarlet, calling themselves Scarlet Witch or Scarlet Warlock, just as certain other sorcerers choose to identify with complex rather than basic colors. One Scarlet Warlock has two children, his daughter Natalya Maximoff, a powerful magic-user, and his son Django Maximoff, a medicine man and storyteller whose latent magic abilities bring a strange life to his puppets. Among Natalya's people, red is considered a color of bad luck. Natalya enjoys this and happily adopts the title Scarlet Witch, believing it implies misfortune for her enemies. As the Scarlet Witch, she spends years fighting a variety of mystical enemies that threaten humanity, sometimes aided by allies such as the centuries-old sorceress Agatha Harkness of New Salem. Her brother Django remains with their tribe, making a home in Serbia with his wife Marya. Django and Marya have twins, Ana and Mateo, but the children tragically die while still young.

While still living in Serbia, Natalya has twin children, Pietro Maximoff and Wanda Marya Maximoff. According to the demonic Elder God called Chthon, he witnesses Wanda's birth and infuses her with some of his own magical energy in hopes to one day use her as a host vessel. The Avengers #187 (Marvel Comics, 1979). While she battles more villains and menaces, Natalya leaves her children in the care of her brother and sister in law who now live with other Romany in Novi Pazar, Serbia. The area is soon attacked by the Knights of Wundagore. Their leader and creator, the geneticist Herbert Wyndham, known to many as the High Evolutionary, wants to experiment on children who have the genetics to possibly achieve great superhuman power. Knowing Wanda and Pietro are children of a powerful witch, a local priest gives the twins to the High Evolutionary to stop the attacks. The twins are taken to the High Evolutionary's base at Mount Wundagore in the neighboring country of Transia. According to the High Evolutionary, his experiments allows the twins the potential for power later (and, by chance, also wrongly makes them appear to be mutants to most tests), but the results are not as impressive as he desires.

While the children are still at Mount Wundagore, they are attended by Bova, a cow engineered by the High Evolutionary who acts as a nurse. Later on, the retired superhero the Whizzer (Robert Frank) and his pregnant wife Miss America (Madeline Joyce Frank) arrive at Mount Wundagore. Madeline goes into labor, and both baby and mother die. Hoping to ease the suffering of her husband, and believing the children would be better raised away from Mount Wundagore, Bova tells Frank the twins are his children. Overwhelmed by the death of his wife, Frank leaves rather than adopt the children.

Tracking down her children, Natalya Maximoff attacks Wundagore and fights the High Evolutionary's forces to a stand-still. During the attack, she is killed by the father of Wanda and Pietro. Either because he has no more use for the children or is impressed by the heroism of their mother, the High Evolutionary tracks down Django and Marya Maximoff and gives them the twins. Django and Marya decide not to explain the twins' true heritage to them until they are old enough to accept their real mother was a sorceress who died in battle (the Maximoffs mistakenly believe the High Evolutionary's forces killed her). Before the twins reach their tenth birthday, they start to show signs of superhuman abilities, with Pietro using superhuman speed and Wanda casting minor hexes that cause a variety of effects, such as momentarily moving or levitating objects.

Locals who hold prejudice against the Roma people hear rumors of the twins' powers. After Django steals bread to feed his family, the locals attack the Roma tribe, burning down their homes. The Maximoff wagon is set on fire with Marya still inside and Django is beaten by multiple attackers. Wanda and Pietro flee, believing Django and Marya are dead. Unknown to them, Marya survives the fire, though her body and face suffer serious burns and scarring. Django, mourning the loss of yet more children and overwhelmed by guilt that he couldn't protect Marya, suffers a break from reality. He convinces himself Wanda and Pietro were his biological children Ana and Mateo, and that Marya is dead. He starts a new, solitary life, while Marya returns to Serbia and stays with friends.

Repressing much of the memory of their trauma, Wanda and Pietro travel through Transia as homeless orphans for years. During this time, the aggressive Pietro becomes almost obsessively protective of his sister, even referring to her as his "little sister" because she is 13 minutes younger. Wanda's "hex power" becomes focused enough that she can instantly cause bad luck for enemies. When the twins are in their late teens, Wanda uses her power to save a child. This leads to locals accusing her of witchcraft and attempting to burn her alive at a stake. Having heard reports of the twins, the mutant terrorist Magneto arrives and saves her. Learning from the two Maximoffs that their powers emerged naturally and weren't the result of an outside force (as far as they knew), Magneto concludes Wanda and Pietro are mutants. Later scans seems to confirm they each possess the X-gene, which marks a mutant human from an average human.

Telling them they now owe him a debt for his rescue, Magneto makes them his first recruits for the original Brotherhood of Evil Mutants (later simply called the Brotherhood of Mutants). Pietro adopts the code name Quicksilver, while Wanda assumes the name Scarlet Witch. Initially, it is indicated she gets the name from an accusation shouted by a person hoping to burn her at the stake. Later, Wanda reveals the name came into her mind when she first realized she had powers, a sign she was inheriting her mother's magical abilities. During their missions alongside Magneto against the heroic X-Men, the twins only help reluctantly. At times, they work to prevent the X-Men and Magneto's human targets from being seriously harmed or killed. Wanda also deals with the unwanted advances of teammates Toad and Mastermind.

The Avengers
When Magneto is abducted by the cosmic entity known as the Stranger, the original Brotherhood team dissolves and the twins declare their debt now paid. Wishing to atone for their crimes and help stop threats like Magneto, Quicksilver and the Scarlet Witch contact the Avengers. At the time, the group's founding roster is ready to go their separate ways. Accepting the twins, as well as the archer Hawkeye who had been manipulated into committing crimes and fighting Iron Man in the past, Captain America becomes leader of this new Avengers team. The group is jokingly called by some "Cap's Kooky Quartet."

Wanda is accidentally shot on a mission against Magneto. Enraged, Quicksilver leaves the Avengers with his wounded sister and rejoins Magneto. After a pair of encounters with the X-Men, the twins reaffirm that they don't believe in Magneto's cause or methods and leave him. Some time later, Wanda and Pietro are kidnapped along with several other mutants by the robot Sentinels, but are subsequently freed by the X-Men.

After the warlord Arkon kidnaps Wanda, Quicksilver returns to the Avengers for help. After her rescue, the twins rejoin the team. Scarlet Witch then falls in love with recent Avenger recruit the Vision. While he is an android or "synthezoid" (built from a copy of the original Human Torch, a synthetically created man), Vision's personality programming is partly based on the brainwaves of Wonder Man, allowing him to develop his own mind and emotions. Initially guarded because he fears he is a soulless machine and cannot have a relationship with a human, Vision later reveals his feelings for Wanda. Quicksilver objects due to his belief that a "robot" is not capable of genuine love, while Hawkeye resents the romance because he has feelings for Wanda himself. Despite this, the entire team (except for Quicksilver) comes to approve of the pairing.

Wanda and Pietro meet Robert Frank, who reveals he believes them to be his children. Hearing Frank describe how his wife died in childbirth at Mount Wundagore, Wanda believes his story and for some time afterward refers to herself as Wanda Frank. Later on, Django Maximoff comes to America and tells Wanda and Pietro they are his children Ana and Mateo. The twins journey with Django to Wundagore. There, Wanda is temporarily possessed by the demon Chthon, who claims he witnessed her birth and imbued some of his own magical energy into her so she could be a host later on. Meanwhile, Quicksilver meets Bova who confirms that neither the Maximoffs nor the Franks are the twins' parents. Bova claims she delivered Wanda and Pietro herself when a pregnant woman named Magda came to Wundagore after fleeing her dangerous husband, a vengeful man with superhuman abilities. At the end of the adventure, Wanda is freed from her possession and Django dies. Mourning him and wishing to honor that he and his wife raised them for a time, Wanda and Pietro drop the Frank surname and use Maximoff as their last name again. Realizing she has a talent for magic, Wanda becomes an apprentice to the sorceress Agatha Harkness, gaining greater control over her hexes and learning true magic. Agatha does not reveal she knew Wanda's mother Natalya or that Wanda and Pietro are mistaken in thinking they're mutants.

The Scarlet Witch and the Vision get married. While the team approves, Quicksilver still objects and some members of the public are angered by the event, believing neither a mutant nor an android can legally be married. Some time later, the two take a leave of absence from the Avengers in order to establish a life for themselves outside of the team and spend some time focusing on their relationship. The two move to a house in the suburbs of Leonia, New Jersey. The couple meet Robert Frank again, who learns Wanda and Pietro are not his children. He then dies trying to protect Wanda, Vision, and his true son Nuklo from his old enemy Isbisa.

Around this time, Magneto attempts once again to track down what happened to Magda, his wife who fled from him years before. Magneto finds Bova, who tells him a woman named Magda arrived years ago, pregnant with twins. After the children Wanda and Pietro were born, Magda then fled. Concluding Quicksilver and the Scarlet Witch are his own children, that Magda must have been pregnant when she fled him, Magneto leaves. Shortly after the birth of Pietro's daughter Luna, Magneto visits the child and tells Quicksilver and Scarlet Witch that he is their father, asking to start a new relationship with them. Wanda and Pietro are uneasy about the revelation that Magneto is their father, but accept his claim. Later, prejudiced neighbors burn down Vision and Wanda's house, and they take up residence in Avengers Mansion again, rejoining the team.

When the alien computer ISAAC takes over Vision's personality, he becomes corrupt and takes over international computer and security systems as part of a plan for global domination. He is restored to his proper mind, now having a stronger sense of identity, deciding he is not a copy of Wonder Man but more like a twin. The US government insists on confining Vision and studying him so he can't be taken over by another computer again, claiming that as an Avenger he must comply with orders from the US government. To ensure his freedom, Wanda and Vision quit the Avengers again, returning to a life as private citizens and purchasing a new home in Leonia, New Jersey. Vision then reveals his stronger sense of identity has also led to a desire to have a family with Wanda. While he hopes her magic can make this possible, Wanda is doubtful.

The Vision and Wanda are kidnapped by the residents of New Salem, who reveal they recently killed Agatha Harkness (Agness). During a magical ceremony, the corrupt leader of New Salem is defeated, causing excess magical energy to go wild. Using Agatha's lessons of tapping into different magical sources, Wanda taps into the excess energy and channels it safely away. Before she finishes, she hears Agatha's spirit tell her to use the incredible magical power while she's still connected to it. Instinctively, Wanda uses it to make herself pregnant. Months later, Wanda's old Brotherhood of Mutants teammate Toad attacks Leonia in order to take her as his bride. Seeing she is now eight months pregnant, he is repulsed and Wanda defeats him. Wanda later goes into labor and is attended by the physician and sorcerer Dr. Strange, who is surprised when she gives birth to twins. The boys are named Thomas (for Phineas Thomas Horton, the scientist who created the android Human Torch) and William (in reference to Wonder Man's real name, Simon Williams). Eventually, the Vision and Scarlet Witch relocate their family to Los Angeles, joining the new West Coast Avengers.

Loss of marriage and children 
Believing the Vision may have downloaded state secrets when he temporarily had international power and could do so again, various governments agree to a joint operation. Operatives kidnap and dismantle Vision, wiping out his personality. Vision is then rebuilt, his red-colored skin now chalk-white. While his memories are mostly restored, he is now without emotions. Scarlet Witch hopes to restore his personality with Wonder Man's help, but he refuses due to his own secret feelings for Wanda and his uneasiness of choosing to create a copy of his emotions in someone else. Wanda seeks out help in restoring Vision's emotions but becomes corrupted by a parasitic life form called That Which Endures. Under its influence, Wanda turns against the Avengers. That Which Endures is then defeated and Wanda's mind restored.

Agatha Harkness arrives (explaining that true witches have learned to protect themselves from burning and other methods non-witches have used to kill them) and reveals Thomas and William are not real but the result of Wanda suffering a "hysterical pregnancy" that influenced her magic and created constructs. Wanda's powers cannot create life, so the "souls" of the twins were drawn from scattered pieces of the demon lord Mephisto, whose power had been split into several pieces after a battle with the powerful Franklin Richards, son of Reed and Sue Richards of the Fantastic Four. Mephisto arrives and re-absorbs the life energies of the children into himself, restoring his power and seemingly wiping them from existence. Realizing this has created a connection between the demon lord and the Scarlet Witch, Agatha temporarily removes Wanda's memories of her children, causing a mental shock to Mephisto that allows his defeat. It is later revealed Vision suspected the children were only magical projections and had attempted to discuss it with Wanda, but she refused to listen.

Years later, the Young Avengers team is created, including Billy Kaplan in its ranks, a teenager first called "Asgardian" and then later "Wiccan." After the team meets teenage hero Tommy Shepherd, who calls himself Speed, Billy correctly concludes he and Tommy are the reincarnated twins of Wanda and Vision. The story Avengers: The Children's Crusade indicates Mephisto lied to Wanda about the nature of her children, reavling William and Thomas were "lost souls" who were raised by Wanda and Vision after her magic allowed them to be physically born, only to then have their lives "taken" by Mephisto. How Mephisto lost the two souls while absorbing the energy of their physical forms, and how the children were then reincarnated as babies born years before Wanda and Vision's marriage, babies who belonged to two different families, is not explained.

Nexus being 
Immediately after losing her children, Wanda is brainwashed again, this time to become a "Bride of Set." She is freed from control but becomes catatonic, apparently as a result of recent traumas. Believing he cannot help Wanda and is not needed with the west coast team, Vision returns to the NYC-based Avengers team. Wonder Man offers the use of his brainwaves to restore Vision's emotions, but the android refuses, believing he is now a separate person from whom he was before and not wishing to accept a copy of someone else's identity. Days after Vision leaves, Wanda becomes responsive again, now with incredibly enhanced power and a personality that hates humans and delights in suffering. She attacks the Avengers, sexually assaults Wonder Man, and rejoins with Magneto (who himself recently has returned to his terrorist ways after spending some time working with the X-Men). Investigating Wanda's change in personality and power level, Agatha Harkness discovers both changes are caused by the time villain Immortus. Realizing Wanda is a nexus being, a person whose very existence affects probability and timelines, Immortus hopes to use this great power for himself. For years, he has manipulated Wanda's life, hoping (like Chthon in the past) to use her as his pawn so he can increase his power.

As the Avengers battle Immortus, Agatha reminds Wanda of her love for her friends and family. Realizing she has been manipulated, Wanda gives up the nexus energies inside her. No longer a nexus being, her mind and full memories of Thomas and William are restored. Defeated and no longer having use for the Scarlet Witch without her nexus energy, Immortus leaves. Wanda returns to the Avengers but is now seemingly powerless. With Vision still unable to feel or reciprocate love, he and Wanda have their marriage annulled. Soon afterward, Wonder Man makes his romantic feelings for Wanda clear, but she tells him she only sees him as a friend. This leads to resentment and tension for some time.

Weeks after releasing her reality-warping Nexus energy and being freed from Immortus's control, Wanda's original hex power returns when Pietro needs her help. She finds her power is now unreliable, operating on the same level as when she first joined the Brotherhood of Mutants. To compensate for her lower power level, she studies magic again, seeking help from Agatha and Dr. Strange when faced with magical threats. While practicing honing her talents, Wanda accidentally creates a window that seems to show an alternate timeline where she, Vision, and their children remain together. Happy to see that somewhere in the multiverse her children are real and happy, and glad her memories of them returned after only a short time, Wanda believes she can cope with the loss of family she's suffered. When Vision returns to Avengers West to help against the villain Ultron, Wanda hopes they might resume their romance but is disheartened to see Vision still lacks emotion and regards himself as a different person than the one who married her. Later, Wanda is nominated as leader of the Avengers West team.

Force Works 

The members of Avengers West are called to Avengers Mansion in NYC to discuss whether or not the team California-based team is a failed experiment, considering some of their defeats, the destruction of their headquarters, and the loss of different members. A vote results in Avengers West officially dissolving, its members now designated as reservists of the main Avengers team. Rather than accept this status, Iron Man quits, prompting the other former members of Avengers West to follow suit. In Ventura, California, Iron Man forms a new, more proactive team called Force Works and asks Wanda to be leader. The team suffers several setbacks, including the seeming death of Wonder Man during their first adventure.

During "The Crossing" crossover, Iron Man is corrupted by villains and turns against the Avengers. Working with the main Avengers team again, Wanda encounters Vision, who has regained his original appearance as well as the capacity for emotions. When he implies he misses her, she quickly tells him their relationship is in the past. Wanda is unaware that not only has Vision regained his ability to feel but he also once again has all his emotional ties to the memories of his life before he was dismantled. Seeing how guarded she is and wishing to spare her more pain, Vision does not reveal this. At the end of "The Crossing," Iron Man seemingly dies and the Force Works team decides to disband soon afterward. The Scarlet Witch and Hawkeye return to the main Avengers team, once again becoming teammates with Quicksilver and Vision. To make amends for his behavior in the past, Quicksilver attempts to help Wanda reconcile with Vision so they can be friends again, knowing she feels nervous and awkward around him now.

Wanda is with the Avengers and the Fantastic Four when the two teams fight the powerful villain Onslaught. During their final battle, Vision is seriously injured and asks for Wanda, asking her to hold him. She does so and soon both join the Fantastic Four and Avengers in a plan to destroy Onslaught by sacrificing themselves. Due to the intervention of Franklin Richards, the Scarlet Witch and her teammates are not killed but transported to an alternate version of Earth where they live out new versions of their lives. In this reality, Wanda is a sorceress with no mutant abilities. Later on, the heroes are returned to the mainstream Marvel Earth, only months after they vanished and were believed dead. As a result of Franklin Richards subconsciously wishing to "fix" and restore the heroes he sent to the "Heroes Reborn" Earth, Iron Man is restored to life.

Chaos magic
Now back home, the Avengers discuss reforming but are attacked by Morgan le Fay, who kidnaps Wanda. She uses the Scarlet Witch as a conduit for magical forces, enhancing her probability powers to such a degree that she is able to warp reality according to Morgan's wishes. During this adventure, Wanda resurrects Wonder Man as an energy being by summoning his ionic energies back into a humanoid form. After the encounter with Morgan, the Scarlet Witch has an increase in power and realizes she can access magic used by others. Following the battle with Morgan, Wanda repeatedly checks on Vision, who takes weeks to recuperate from injuries he suffered. Vision, afraid to hurt Wanda again if they attempted to have a relationship again, insists that while he may have a personality again, he is still a different person than the one she married. Conflicted about her feelings for Vision and his seemingly cold and harsh attitude toward her, Wanda inadvertently summons Wonder Man again, who comforts her. Later on, she restores Wonder Man to physical form.

Wanda seeks help from Agatha Harkness about her increased power. Agatha explains Wanda's mutant genes allow her to directly access magical energies, explaining her ability to learn powerful sorcery so quickly. By now channeling chaos magic, the same magic Chthon imbued her with soon after her birth, the Scarlet Witch becomes a powerful sorceress despite her lack of years of training. Agatha also points out that Wanda's own self-doubt and worry about living up to what she perceives as the expectations of others has held her back from realizing the full potential of this power and accessing real chaos magic before. After these talks and a battle against the Grim Reaper, Wanda becomes a more formidable superhero, now considered one of the most powerful Avengers alongside heroes such as Thor and Carol Danvers. While she cannot bend reality to her will and is not a Sorcerer Supreme, it is later said that even those who have the Phoenix Force now have cause to fear her. Following another battle, the temporary absence of Iron Man and Captain America leads the team to decide Wanda is the natural choice to assume the duties of Avengers deputy leader and she accepts.

Wanda realizes she has been in denial of growing feelings for Wonder Man for some time and the two begin a relationship. Later on, Wanda realizes Vision lied about still thinking of himself as a new person and has regained the full emotional connections to his memories before he was dismantled, including their relationship. Sympathetic that Vision misses her, Wanda remains firm about leaving their relationship in the past and continuing her romance with Simon, adding that a reunion may have been possible earlier if her former husband hadn't chosen to lie and close himself off. Later, she has a copy of her own brain patterns made and gifts it to Vision, suggesting that one day if he wishes he can create a friend or love interest who is similar to her and understands him but is not an exact copy of her, just as he and Wonder Man are similar but not exact copies of each other. Months later, Wonder Man breaks up with Wanda. Weeks afterward, Wanda and Vision discuss possibly resuming their relationship.

Reality-warping era

Through circumstances not explained, Wanda once again loses the memories of her children's existence, as well as the memories of the years spent learning to coping with the loss afterward. When she hears the Wasp reference the twins, Wanda's memories come flooding back, causing her to relive the trauma. It is later revealed in Avengers: The Children's Crusade that at this point, feeling betrayed that her teammates allowed her mind to be tampered with, the Scarlet Witch seeks out help from the sorcerer and scientist Doctor Doom, hoping he can restore her children to life. To do so, they summon a mysterious and powerful cosmic force that merges with her and increases her power a hundredfold, leaving her emotionally broken, similar to what happened with Chthon, That Which Endures, and Immortus before. Wanda becomes enraged at the Avengers for allowing her children to die and letting Agatha Harkness tamper with her memories, leading to the events of Avengers Disassembled.

After killing Agatha, Scarlet Witch secretly launches a campaign of terror against the Avengers, influencing minds and creating simulated enemies to attack them. As a result, the Vision is destroyed by a maddened She-Hulk, Hawkeye is killed while fighting a simulated Kree soldier, and Scott Lang is apparently killed in an explosion (it was later revealed that he survived, saved by Wanda's future self who teleport him to the future). With help from Earth's heroes, Doctor Strange defeats Wanda and she falls into a coma. Magneto arrives and then leaves with her. At this time, the general public learns of Wanda's actions.

Realizing the Avengers and the X-Men are seriously contemplating killing his sister due to her increased power and mental instability, Quicksilver convinces Scarlet Witch to use her powers to create a world where everyone has their heart's desire fulfilled, and where the two of them and Magneto rule over a world where mutants are not persecuted. Although this House of M reality warp initially succeeds, several heroes (Hawkeye, Wolverine, and Layla Miller) regain their memories and join forces with others to restore reality. When Magneto discovers he is in a false reality and that Quicksilver is responsible, he murders the speedster. Wanda immediately resurrects her brother. Enraged she was not allowed to create a world where mutants were not persecuted by normal humans, she declares "No more mutants." Her power then causes "M-Day," with most of Earth's mutant population losing their X-gene and powers, including Magneto and Quicksilver (though each later has their powers restored). The event becomes known as "M-Day." Wanda then takes refuge in Transia, blocking her memory of her true identity. Both Beast and a resurrected Hawkeye find her at different times in Transia, but depart after confirming she has no memory of her past. Later, Doom finds her and takes her to Latveria, leaving behind a duplicate robot in Transia in case anyone else comes looking for Wanda.

Return to the Avengers

The Children's Crusade
The teenage mystical hero Wiccan (Billy Kaplan) and his team, the Young Avengers, meet a teenage superhuman Speed. Speed, whose name is Tommy, looks like he could be Wiccan's twin, except that his hair is silver. Although he and Speed were born to different families years before the Scarlet Witch's marriage to Vision, Wiccan concludes the two of them might somehow be reincarnations of Wanda's lost children Thomas and William. The Young Avengers, Magneto, Quicksilver, and the Avengers all try to locate Wanda, eventually finding her amnesiac in Latveria and engaged to Doctor Doom. The gathered heroes learn the truth: after being accidentally reminded of her children's existence by Janet van Dyne, Wanda had initially only wanted to find a way to resurrect Tommy and William and sought out Doom's help. Seeking to use Wanda as a weapon, Doom led her to the Life Force, a powerful mystical energy source.  According to Doom, Wanda cannot affect time and space on her own but is still inherently a nexus of magic, able to act as a conduit for different mystical forces and use their power to increase her own. Wanda's attempts to tap into the Life Force increased her power a hundredfold, once again allowing her to alter reality as she had as a nexus being, but also causing her to enter a maddened state and then cause the events of Avengers Disassembled. Following the events of House of M, Doom found Wanda and manipulated her again, convincing her to be his bride.

Wanda regains her memories of her life and of her recent experiences during Avengers Assembled and House of M. Overwhelmed by the guilt of having attacked her own friends and family,  Wanda attempts suicide but is interrupted and consoled by Wiccan. Wanda then seeks Doom's help in undoing the spell that erased many mutant powers after House of M. Instead, Doom steals the reality-warping Life Force power for himself. Wanda and Wiccan steal back the power, defeating him. Before leaving, Doom, having truly grown to love Wanda and not wanting to see her punished, tells the gathered heroes Wanda would not have attacked the Avengers during Avengers Disassembled if he had not manipulated her into doing so (though it is unclear if he is lying).

Her power now restored to the level she had before Avengers Disassembled, Wanda exiles herself to solitude for a while, knowing many still hate her, particularly mutants, and believing she cannot blame it entirely on outside forces.

Avengers vs. X-Men
During the events of Avengers vs. X-Men, Ms. Marvel and Spider-Woman offer Wanda an official return to the Avengers team. Although she is initially reluctant, she follows them to Avengers Mansion. The Vision, now rebuilt and online again, angrily blames Wanda for manipulating and killing him during Avengers Disassembled. Despite some protest, most of the Avengers defer to the Vision as a tearful Wanda leaves. Though Vision feels sympathy, he stands firm that Wanda has not regained trust yet.

When the Avengers go to retrieve the young mutant Hope Summers and are nearly defeated by a corrupt, Phoenix Force-empowered Cyclops, Scarlet Witch arrives and saves them. Hope then leaves with Scarlet Witch. After further battles involving the Avengers and X-Men, Hope inherits the Phoenix Force. She and Wanda then combine their powers to apparently drive away the Phoenix from Earth by saying "No more Phoenix." This results in mutants across Earth regaining their powers, undoing some of the damage Wanda caused on M-Day. Despite this, many mutants maintain a hatred and fear of Wanda for causing the event in the first place.

Uncanny Avengers
Deciding the Avengers need to make more effort to show public cooperation between mutants and non-mutant superhumans, Captain America authorizes a new Avengers Unity Squad, composed of Avengers and X-Men. He asks Wanda to join the team, giving her a chance to atone for the recent past and show others that redemption is possible. Soon after Wanda joins, teammate Rogue is manipulated by the villainous Apocalypse Twins and kills Wanda. This death is undone when the Unity Squad is projected back in time.

AXIS
After stealing Charles Xavier's mutant telepathy, the Nazi villain Red Skull mounts a new attack. Wanda works with Doctor Strange to cast a moral inversion spell, hoping to draw out Xavier's essence in the Red Skull and put him in control of the body. This spell backfires when Doctor Doom takes Strange's place, resulting in the moral inversion of all heroes and villains in the vicinity, including Wanda. When Quicksilver and Magneto try to reason with the now-villainous Wanda, she attacks them with a magic curse designed to punish her own bloodline. When only Quicksilver is affected, Wanda realizes Magneto is not their father. Before she can pursue this further, Doom appears with the resurrected Jericho Drumm (Brother Voodoo) and the spirit of the hero's dead brother Daniel Drumm. Daniel possesses Wanda, allowing her and Doom to undo the spell and restore the heroes' and villains' moralities to normal.

With the Avengers Unity Squad, the Scarlet Witch and Quicksilver later take a trip to Counter-Earth. After being tracked down and defeated by Luminous (a superhuman woman created from the genetic material of Scarlet Witch and Quicksilver), Wanda and Pietro are brought to the High Evolutionary. He claims Django and Marya Maximoff were their true parents, implying the twins actually are the lost Ana and Mateo. He also reveals that not only are Magneto and Magda not their parents, but they are not mutants and have no X-gene. He explains their superhuman traits are the result of him experimenting on them as children, then abandoning them to the Maximoffs when he was unsatisfied with the results. After the High Evolutionary is defeated, Scarlet Witch and Quicksilver return to Earth with the Avengers Unity Division. Seeing she is upset over recent events and revelations, Vision reaches out to Wanda with compassion rather than judgment, the beginning of a new friendship.

All-New, All-Different Marvel: Scarlet Witch (2016–2017)
Leaving the Avengers so she can reassert her sense of self, Wanda becomes a troubleshooter specializing in magical threats, aided by the ghost of Agatha Harkness. Agatha confirms she has known all along Wanda wasn't a mutant or the child of Magneto, but chose not to say anything lest she influence the Scarlet Witch down the wrong path and disrupt her fate. During her adventures, Wanda quickly concludes some force or hidden enemy is disrupting magic all over Earth. During her initial adventures, she fights Declan Dane, the Emerald Warlock, who decides he will now be Wanda's arch-enemy.

While exploring the Witch's Road, a dimensional path existing outside normal space and time, Wanda meets Natalya Maximoff, another woman who calls herself the Scarlet Witch and a friend of Agatha. Wanda realizes this is her mother's spirit, and that Natalya is visiting the Witch's Road in the past, at a point in time before she is pregnant. After helping each other, Natalya realizes who Wanda must be just as she returns to her time period.

When the second superhero Civil War begins, Pietro asks Wanda for help but she refuses. She also says she resents Pietro still trying to tell her what to do as though she were a lost child, bluntly telling him that she has grown whereas his refusal to learn from his past mistakes marks him as a sociopath in her eyes. She invites Pietro to join her quest to learn more about Natalya Maximoff but he refuses.

Wanda's search for answers leads her to Serbia and the priest who gave up her and Pietro to the High Evolutionary. Finding her aunt and adopted mother Marya still alive, Wanda finally learns the truth about her mother and her biological relationship to Django and Marya. Wanda finally discovers a demonic manifestation of chaos is responsible for disrupting and attempting to destroy witchcraft. Wanda joins forces with the spirits of Natalya and Agatha, and together the three witches weaken the chaos entity long enough for Quicksilver (whom Natalya summons) to destroy it. Wanda and Pietro reconcile. To save magic, Natalya sacrifices her spirit, knowing this means she will no longer be able to communicate with Wanda or even maintain her own identity as a ghost. Before she vanishes, Natalya reveals it was not the High Evolutionary who killed her when she attempted to rescue her children. She was killed by Wanda and Pietro's father. But she vanishes before she can reveal the identity of this man. After seeing her mother's sacrifice, and now having a stronger sense of her past and identity, Wanda re-dedicates herself to being a superhero and an Avenger.

Later, during the "Last Days of Magic" arc, Scarlet Witch helps Doctor Strange defeat the Empirikul, a science cult focused on destroying magic in every dimension.

Secret Empire
An alternate version of Captain America is created, one loyal to the terrorist organization Hydra. Taking the place of the real Steve Rogers, this "Hydra Cap" eventually attempts to take control over the United States in the Secret Empire crossover. Wanda initially joins the fight to stop Hydra, but the gathered heroes fail. Afterward, Wanda is brainwashed into serving Hydra's version of the Avengers. Later, it is revealed Chthon has taken advantage of the situation to once again possess the Scarlet Witch, causing mental instability. During a later battle, Doctor Strange works to free Wanda from Chthon's control again. The true Captain America later returns and the events of the Secret Empire crossover are undone.

Dawn of X
Magneto, Charles Xavier, and many of their mutant allies and enemies decide to create a sovereign nation state for mutants on the living island Krakoa. In this new mutant nation, Wanda is considered an enemy of the state of Krakoa for the events of M-Day, ranked as second on the list of most dangerous enemies to mutantkind, since the removal of the X-gene resulted in 986,420 deaths (the top enemy Bolivar Trask created the mutant-hunting Sentinel robots responsible for 16,521,618 deaths and counting). Magneto's former follower Exodus has called Wanda "the Great Pretender" in connection to the revelation that she is neither Magneto's daughter or a mutant at all and encouraged mutant children to hate her by imparting around campfires stories of her and how she took away mutant powers on M-Day.

Strange Academy 
Wanda is a teacher at the Strange Academy, a school founded by Doctor Strange to train young people from many worlds with magical abilities in the use of sorcery and magical artefacts.

Empyre
During the "Empyre" storyline, flashbacks reveal that against the advice of Doctor Strange, Wanda tried to atone for her past sins and mistakes by addressing the genocide of 16 million mutants on the island Genosha committed years earlier at the hands of Cassandra Nova. She spends a year gathering arcane artifacts to redeem herself unaware the nation of Krakoa had already established resurrection protocols to bring back dead mutants and prevent further deaths. Her attempt to resurrect the millions of Genoshan mutants goes awry causing the mutants to return as zombies. Wanda sought help from Doctor Strange, who gave her aid while also holding her accountable. Doctor Strange is able to counter Wanda's spell, but informs her that it will take roughly 30 days for her spell to wear off. So he creates a barrier around Genosha to prevent any undead from leaving. However, the barrier did not stop the living from entering the island though. Around this time, a group of Cotati had set up base on Genosha as part of an attempted invasion of Wakanda, leading them to being attacked by the undead. A team of X-Men is sent to investigate as the Gateways on Krakoa were being affected and are soon overwhelmed by both aliens and Cotati until the spell wears off. After the Genoshan undead turn to dust, the X-Men leave unaware that these events had been caused by the Scarlet Witch. Since then, Wanda has continued to work with the Avengers and recently worked with a team of heroes that fought Cotati agents in the Savage Land.

Hellfire Gala
Even though they are not related by blood, Magneto still believes there is a bond between himself and Wanda Maximoff and invites her to the first annual Hellfire Gala. Still ashamed of her actions against the mutant population via M-Day, Wanda declines and only agrees to see Magneto in private. After he promises to help alleviate the tension between herself and the mutant nation of Krakoa, they share a dance. Soon afterwards, Wanda is seemingly found dead by her son Speed.

The Trial of Magneto
Due to evidence Wanda's attacker possessed magnetic abilities, Magneto is deemed a prime suspect. Following the attack, the Avengers invade the mutant nation of Krakoa and a complicated confrontation ensues. Wanda is resurrected by the power of Krakoa's "resurrection protocols", used to restore mutants by recreating their bodies and then implanting a "back-up" copy of their mind previously recorded to the super-computer Cerebro. As her mind's last back-up to Cerebro was recorder before the events of Avengers Disassembled, the resurrected Wanda clone has no memories of recent years. As others attempt to restore Wanda's mind, she is overwhelmed by the guilt of suddenly remembering the last few years and her actions, causing her to create physical constructs of monsters. Meanwhile, on the astral plane, the spirit of the murderer Wanda finds herself facing a vision of an older self who confronts her with uncomfortable truths she has denied. Realizing the need to heal by accepting her actions and forgiving herself, the three Wandas stop the monster attack and then merge together, resulting in a fully restored Wanda who now knows there is at least one possible future where she will grow old and wise.

Unwilling to explain their resurrection program to outsiders, the mutants of Krakoa tell the Avengers that someone attempted to murder Wanda but she did not die from the attack. Evidence is found against the mutant Toad, who is found guilty and punished, and the Avengers leave. It is revealed Wanda was secretly worked with the mutants Polaris, Legion, and Proteus to increase the capabilities the resurrection protocols but that doing so required her physical death. She recruited Magneto's help in arranging her own death, a suicide disguised by magic to look like a murder. Thanks to Wanda's plan, a pocket dimension "Waiting Room" is created which now allows all mutants to be resurrected, including those who never had a chance to manifest their X-gene and those whose minds were not able to be copied to the computer Cerebro. Learning this, the mutants of Krakoa who once referred to Wanda as a "Pretender" have forgiven her for the M-Day incident and Exodus himself has given her the new title of "The Redeemer"." Wanda is now a welcome guest of the mutant nation, telling her story to children so they may learn from her mistakes.

Powers and abilities

When the Scarlet Witch was first created by Lee and Kirby, her main ability was a vaguely defined "hex power" that could cause random and unlikely things to affect her enemies or other targets, often in the form of "bad luck." These effects could be unpredictable, however, and thus not always helpful to Wanda. The vague and unpredictable nature of her power meant Wanda could use her ability in a variety of ways that helped the plot but also meant she couldn't easily solve all her problems.

Despite the character's name, the Scarlet Witch's powers stemmed not from witchcraft or magic but from being a mutant who could affect probability. Later stories gave her increased control, allowing her to release targeted "hex-bolts" that could cause enemy weapons to backfire, their abilities to fail, or the area around them to suffer sudden damage and instability. Eventually, she also became adept at casting energy blasts that could directly stun opponents. She later realizes her hex-bolts are the most basic use of chaos magic.

Writer Steve Englehart decided the character could become more powerful and formidable by living up to her name. His stories revealed Wanda had a strong talent for magic, possibly caused by the demon Chthon giving her latent magical talent as a child. Under Englehart, Wanda studies spell casting and the manipulation of magical forces under the tutelage of Agatha Harkness. Along with increasing her control over the effects of her hexes, this allows her to counter, deflect, and block a variety of magical attacks.

Writer Kurt Busiek redefined Scarlet Witch's powers, explaining that like Magneto, her mutant ability allowed her to tap into and manipulate a specific form of energy. Busiek suggested Wanda may have originally developed the power to access energy related to the electromagnetic spectrum if she'd been left alone, but Chthon's interference soon after her birth influenced her genetics to tap into magical energy. Busiek depicted the sorceress Morgan le Fey remarking that while Wanda cannot fully warp time and space on her own (not since giving up her nexus being status), her ability to alter probability coupled with her magical talent meant others could use her as a conduit for multiple, powerful energies at once, and thus she could become a tool used to warp reality. Following her encounter with Morgan, Wanda learns that her hex abilities are an expression of chaos magic, the same magic Chthon used. By trusting in herself more, Wanda learns how to directly tap into chaos magic to increase her power and achieve a variety of effects, making her one of Earth's most powerful magic users. She also realized she could manipulate other forms of energy (though this required greater focus and strength). During Busiek's run, as well as the subsequent run by Geoff Johns, she was shown to be capable of large-scale spells given enough concentration and time to shape them to a specific goal, including the creation of a hurricane. Wanda's new chaos magic allows her to collect Wonder Man's near-immortal ionic energies and reconstitute them, allowing him temporary existence as an energy being and then eventually bringing him back to life as a physical being (although Wanda has been unable to resurrect normal human beings who are not energy-based life forms).  The series Avengers vs X-Men confirmed that Wanda now largely relies on chaos magic.

A 2015 Uncanny Avengers story revealed Wanda was never a mutant, despite the assumption of others and what certain scientific tests indicated. Her and Quicksilver's superhuman traits, the genes that allowed her to directly access magical energy sources, were the result of the High Evolutionary experimenting on them as infants. This is in line with Busiek's explanation for her powers, with only the classification of "mutant" being changed.

In the 2016–2017 Scarlet Witch comic series, it is confirmed Wanda was always born with the ability to utilize witchcraft, a trait she inherited from other members of her family. The High Evolutionary's genetic tampering gave greater and direct access to magical energies, making her more powerful than she may have been otherwise, but was not solely responsible for her magical abilities.

Reality warping 

Due to her unique genetics, Wanda is a nexus of magical energy, able to instinctively tap into different mystical power sources more easily than even highly trained sorcerers. Because of this, Wanda has temporarily grained the power to alter reality on multiple occasions by taking energy from another person or outside force.

When she was temporarily linked to magical energies around the town of New Salem, a magic-user community, Wanda seemingly used that energy to make herself pregnant. Later on, during John Byrne's Avengers West Coast stories, Wanda was said to be able to create lifelike illusions if her desire to do so was great enough. She later becomes powerful enough to hold multiple Avengers paralyzed through force of will. Writers Roy and Dann Thomas revealed this power increase and the ability to cast illusions were all due to Wanda's status as a nexus being, someone who has great influence over the reality around her and acts as an anchor point between timelines. The villain Immortus manipulated Wanda, causing a change of personality and drawing out her nexus energies in order to increase her overall power. Rather than be used as a tool by Immortus, Wanda completely released her nexus energies, giving up her ability to influence reality more than others. This restored her mind and the memories of her lost children, but also resulted in a temporary loss of her hex power. They returned weeks later, though weaker and unreliable. Wanda needed time and training to regain her previous power levels.

When the sorceress Morgan le Fey used Wanda as a conduit for different magical energy sources, this amplified Wanda's abilities. Morgan le Fey then used her to warp time and space, altering Earth to a more medieval setting and convincing the Avengers to act as her loyal servants and soldiers. When the adventure was over, Wanda's ability to warp time and minds vanished, but she now had a stronger ability to access magical energies on her own.

Writer Brian Michael Bendis retconned Wanda's abilities in Avengers Disassembled. The story stated that chaos magic did not exist (in contradiction to previous Marvel stories with Dr. Strange) and was not an energy source used to achieve greater power. Bendis wrote that Wanda's true mutant power was to warp reality itself, as well as influence minds. In House of M, this new power was enough to change history through force of will, creating a new timeline. The later miniseries Avengers: The Children's Crusade restored Wanda's power to what it was before Avengers Disassembled, again defining her as someone whose genes allow her to directly tap into magical fields, including chaos magic. Her actions during Avengers Disassembled and House of M were explained as a temporary power increase due to a magical entity that bonded with her, similar to her earlier possessions by Chthon and Immortus and her time as a tool of Morgan le Fey.

Cultural impact and legacy

Critical reception 
George Marston of Newasrama called the Scarlet Witch "one of the most important characters in Marvel Comics history," writing, "Before Wanda was the growing center of the MCU, she was the heart-and-soul of the Avengers in comic books for years, with her long narrative sowing the seeds of some of the greatest - and most tragic - Marvel Comics stories ever. In comics, Wanda is considered a Nexus Being, an entity of unique Multiversal power. But in a more metatextual sense, she's something of a nexus being for the Marvel Universe's larger narrative thanks to the vast, wide-reaching array of characters to whom she is directly related - and whose lives she's had influence over. [...] Whether it's on the page or on-screen, any time Wanda Maximoff shows up, she has a way of magnetically drawing in all the subplots around her directly into her own complex story and bringing the characters involved into her ever-growing family. Whether Marvel is ready to admit it or not, we'll say it: Wanda Maximoff, the Scarlet Witch, is one of the most important characters in Marvel Comics history." Dalton Norman of Screen Rant stated, "As Scarlet Witch recently proved in Doctor Strange in the Multiverse of Madness, characters from Marvel Comics can sometimes walk a fine line between heroism and villainy. The Avengers are known as the greatest collection of heroes in Marvel Comics, but occasionally a former villain can switch sides and join the squad. From Avengers mainstays such as Hawkeye to short-lived members such as fan-favorite Spider-Man foe Venom, even the most dastardly villains can have a change of heart. Though many former villains have joined the team, only a few left an impression on readers to be counted among the best the Avengers have to offer.Like her brother Pietro, Wanda Maximoff was created by the High Evolutionary, even though fans were led to believe she was a mutant for most of her existence in the comics. The powerful sorceress debuted as part of Magneto's Brotherhood of Evil Mutants but very quickly turned good after fighting the X-Men. Though she wasn't an original member of the team, Wanda's tenure as an Avenger has been one of the longest and most impactful. Her brushes with antiheroism have made her a fascinating character to follow, and her Avengers status carried over when she joined Hawkeye as a leader of the West Coast Avengers." Mason Downey of GameSpot asserted, "Much like her on-again-off-again romantic interest, Vision, Wanda Maximoff AKA Scarlet Witch has been rocketed into the pop culture mainstream by her prominent role in the Marvel Cinematic Universe--and that spotlight is only going to get brighter now that she's making her way to her very own show. [...] Wanda's publication history has stretched on for almost six decades, and in that time, the character has defied strict definition. Even her powers, which started as "hexes" and then gradually became cosmic-level reality warping, have never been easy to pin down or explain. But for as esoteric as Wanda is, and probably always will be, she does have some pretty easy to spot throughlines. Thematically, Wanda's existence in the Marvel Universe hinges on both change and evolution—she's used to explore the fear of things far outside our control and the complex balance of power and responsibility. If you think Peter Parker has it bad as a guy who can sling webs and do cool acrobatics, imagine being a person who can speak any idea she has into existence—even at the cost of hundreds of thousands of lives." David Harth of CBR.com wrote, "Powers like Scarlett Witch's have led her to achieve things that other heroes and villains can only dream of, be they for good or ill. Scarlet Witch has long been one of Marvel's most important characters, first battling the X-Men as a member of the Brotherhood of Evil Mutants and then finding a home with the Avengers. Over the years, she's gone through a lot, as the trials and tribulations of her life proved to be too much for her more than once. Over the years, Scarlet Witch has done some amazing things. Powers like hers have led her to achieve things that other heroes and villains can only dream of, be they for good or ill, sometimes doing things only gods can do."

Donald D. Markstein of Don Markstein's Toonopedia asserted, "The Scarlet Witch is unique among superheroes, and not just because she's the only one who wears a wimple. Her super power is unlike any other — she can alter probability so as to cause mishaps for her foes. In other words, she "hexes" them. At first her hexes were rather haphazard, but with years of practice, they've become both stronger and better controlled." Eric Diaz of Nerdist referred to the Scarlet Witch as one of the "comic book medium’s most witchiest witches of all time," saying, "She’s maybe the most famous superhero with the word “Witch” as part of her name. But did you know she wasn’t originally a real witch at all? When she was introduced in 1964’s X-Men #4, as a character who had the mutant power to project “hexes.” Basically, she could make bad stuff happen at random moments. But in the ’70s, Wanda discovered that she could use her powers to tap into Chaos magic, and became a true sorceress. She became powerful enough that she once altered all of reality itself in House of M." Darren Franich of Entertainment Weekly stated, "The weird beating heart of the Avengers, the Scarlet Witch has been a hero and a villain, a strongwilled leader and an eternally tormented subject of untold psychological trauma. She can be cosmically powerful, or she can just cast lots of red energy at a problem; she’s a mutant, but she also has magical powers. In stark contrast to her petulant drip of a brother (see No. 63), Wanda’s main problem is that she cares too much. This simple character trait makes her important no matter what the context—she can be a trusty teammate or a half-crazy reality-warping godling. Her powers are ridiculously goofy in theory—”chaos magic”—and it makes sense that Age of Ultron tries to normalize her special abilities into a recognizable assortment of brain powers. But normalizing Scarlet Witch just makes her a duller Jean Grey. The character is supposed to be a bit hard to pin down. The Avengers with their own solo titles are constants; they need wild variables like Scarlet Witch." Sara Century of Syfy said, "In the years since Avengers Disassembled and House of M, Wanda Maximoff has been in a state of constant flux. This is a character who was always at a loss to understands her own power, and she’s been working to stabilize since her very first appearance in X-Men #4 all the way back in 1964. Though Wanda is good-intentioned, more often than not, she ends up a pawn in other people’s schemes. Despite her extraordinary, reality-shifting power, Wanda Maximoff spends most of her time trying to balance the complexities of her own personality. Ever since she whispered “No more mutants” at the end of House of M and very nearly wiped out the mutant race, she has worked towards a redemptive arc that never quite seems to come. On Krakoa, among the X-Men, she is now known as The Great Pretender, considered to be a traitor, a murderer, and a liar. Yet, as always, Wanda’s story is a lot more complicated than that."

IGN called the Scarlet Witch one of the "greatest Avengers of all time," stating, "By far the most controversial character on this list, Wanda Maximoff the Scarlet Witch has performed as many heroic deeds as its finest members, but also caused more damage than some of its worst villains. Wanda joined the team with her brother Quicksilver when the pair wanted to defect from their mutant terrorist father Magneto, and they proved themselves time and time again to be great heroes and dependable members." Jo-Anne Rowney of Daily Mirror referred to the Scarlet Witch as one of the "best female superheroes of all time," saying, "Scarlet Witch is one of the most dangerous heroes in the Marvel world. The daughter of Magneto and sister to Quicksilver, she was originally on the side of the Brotherhood of Evil Mutants in the comics, but she saw sense. Her powers were always a bit vague, but later they became more defined and her true power became evident." Tanzim Pardiwalla of Mashable wrote, "Scarlet Witch is so powerful, its scary. The sorceress specialises in altering reality and is one of the coolest mutants. In one of the comic book arcs, she rebuilds reality and subverts the status of mutants, creating a world in which mutants are higher in hierarchy than humans. Now, that’s someone you wouldn’t want to mess with. There’s something chaotic in her magic and we love the complexity that the charcter has as she switches between being the hero and villain in the comicverse." Alex Abad-Santos of Vox called the Scarlet Witch "one of the most powerful beings the Marvel universe has ever seen," saying, "This being has decimated supergroups, wiped out wide populations of people, and, in some circles, is one of the most hated characters ever created. And this individual has, in the comic books, the power to cause utter devastation. We're not talking about Ultron. Her name is the Scarlet Witch, a.k.a. Wanda Maximoff (played by Elizabeth Olsen). She'll be making her big cinematic debut in AOU, some 51 years after her first appearance in Marvel comic books. That long delay between print and film isn't because Wanda is boring. Indeed, it's the opposite. Her origin is as complex and bizarre as any you'll find at Marvel. She was abandoned at birth and raised, at various points, by a sentient humanoid cow, gypsies, and Magneto, the villainous master of magnetism. Her powers — being able to alter probability and tap into chaos magic — are strange, too, and seemingly difficult to depict in a movie. In fact, there's enough to the Scarlet Witch's story that it could easily fill three Avengers movies."

Jamie Gerber of The Mary Sue wrote, "There has long been a great duality within the character—hero and villain, mutant and witch, creator and destroyer—due in no small part to the litany of writers who’ve struggled with which direction to take her in. However, throughout her long journey in comics, she hasn’t had much agency, often being defined by her romantic relationships and manipulated, sidelined, or both. Many comic fans will point to House of M as an important arc for Scarlet Witch, and yet, even there, she was little more than a plot device in the major Marvel event. Calling that series to mind is an understandable impulse, since the truth is that Wanda doesn’t have an overwhelming number of great stories to pull from. Writers have made an effort to rehab the character’s image in the past few years, but Scarlet Witch has long languished in comic book storylines that failed to allow her to live up to her full potential. Meanwhile, on the screen, WandaVision just wrapped its impressive nine-episode run and has already shown the Marvel Cinematic Universe version of Wanda Maximoff far more compassion than House of M ever did for her comic counterpart." Andrew McGrotty of MovieWeb stated, "Throughout Marvel Comics, The Scarlet Witch has been a key character both as a villain and as an Avenger. Since her first comic book appearance, Wanda Maximoff has had solo adventures and worked with many other heroes to save the world, while also struggling to control the darker side of her abilities. Her unique journey walking the line between light and dark and good and bad has made for some of the most exciting and complex storylines Marvel Comics has had to offer, many of which would be prime stories for the Marvel Cinematic Universe." Chris Vazquez of The Washington Post asserted, "The Scarlet Witch’s popularity skyrocketed after her 2021 solo television series “WandaVision” — especially among LGBTQ fans. In interviews with The Washington Post, many say that Wanda’s experiences with loss, her nontraditional romance (with an android) and her search for family resonate with their journeys. As she returns in Marvel Studios’ “Doctor Strange in the Multiverse of Madness” this week, many have hopes and fears about what she’ll face next. [...] Across comics and films, Wanda receives little support from other characters. The MCU portrays her grieving alone, and in the “House of M” comic-book storyline, other characters consider killing Wanda as she experiences a mental health crisis. For Brandon Bush, a comic book journalist, this absence of support also mirrors systemic injustices. “When you see people like Wanda who aren’t getting the resources that they need, you relate to that because you see your own communities and them not getting the resources that they need,” Bush said."

Feminist interpretation 
Though later incarnations took on feminist overtones, the character of Scarlet Witch was not conceived with ideas of female empowerment in mind. At her debut in the 1960s, the readership for superhero comics was assumed to be mostly male, and the Scarlet Witch was originally seen by some fans and Marvel creators as a token female character with a passive power, used mainly for interpersonal relation plots, perhaps to draw female readers who were believed to prefer romance comics. Avengers writer Roy Thomas even created a group of female superheroes, the Lady Liberators, in order to mock Second-wave feminism. The team is formed by Amora the Enchantress who uses her magic to influence the women members of the Avengers into turning against their male teammates. Wanda realizes the truth and resists Amora's spell, then defeats her single-handedly. The story's last scene depicts Hank Pym warning that "women's lib" is a ridiculous cause, but Wanda answers back that if sexism continues then the Lady Liberators may rise again. Despite the story mocking feminism, this final scene is now considered an early example of Wanda being a positive feminist character. In the 1970s, writer Steve Englehart preferred to make Wanda a more assertive and proactive character who pursued her personal goals and desires. In the 1980s, the first and second The Vision and the Scarlet Witch limited series both underlined Wanda as a woman who appreciated her time with the Avengers but also wanted to have her own life and agenda independent of the team, purchasing a house with Vision so they could have a relationship and even a family that was entirely their own. Englehart, who enjoyed the marriage of Wanda and Vision and created their children Thomas and William, lamented that later stories annulled the marriage, ended the relationship, removed the children, and repeatedly put Wanda in positions where she became temporarily evil due to emotional trauma and the manipulations of others.

Accolades 
 In 2011, Wizard Magazine ranked the Scarlet Witch 97th in their "200 Greatest Comic Book Characters of All Time" list.
 In 2011, Comics Buyer's Guide ranked the Scarlet Witch 14th in their "100 Sexiest Women in Comics" list.
 In 2012, IGN ranked the Scarlet Witch 12th in their "The Top 50 Avengers" list, the second highest rank for a female character.
 in 2015, Entertainment Weekly ranked the Scarlet Witch 3rd in their "Let's rank every Avenger ever" list.
 In 2015, Gizmodo ranked the Scarlet Witch 14th in their "Every Member Of The Avengers, Ranked" list.
 In 2016, Screen Rant ranked the Scarlet Witch 3rd in their "15 Most Powerful Female Superheroes Of All Time" list.
 In 2017, The Daily Dot ranked the Scarlet Witch 31st in their "Top 33 female superheroes of all time" list.
 In 2018, Vanity Fair included the Scarlet Witch in their "Stan Lee’s Most Iconic Characters" list.
 In 2019, Daily Mirror ranked the Scarlet Witch 15th in their "Best female superheroes of all time" list.
 In 2020, Scary Mommy ranked the Scarlet Witch 5th in their "Looking For A Role Model? These 195+ Marvel Female Characters Are Truly Heroic" list.
 In 2021, Bustle ranked the Scarlet Witch 36th in their "37 Most Powerful Characters In The Marvel Universe" list.
 In 2021, CBR.com ranked the Scarlet Witch 2nd in their "20 Most Powerful Female Members Of The Avengers" list.
 In 2022, MovieWeb ranked the Scarlet Witch 1st in their "Toughest Female Superheroes" list.
 In 2022, CBR.com ranked the Scarlet Witch 1st in their "10 Scariest Avengers" list, 2nd in their "10 Strongest Female Villains" list, 8th in their "10 Greatest Avengers" list, and 10th in their "10 Most Attractive Marvel Heroes" list.
 In 2022, Screen Rant included the Scarlet Witch in their "10 Most Powerful Avengers In Marvel Comics" list.
 In 2022, The A.V. Club ranked the Scarlet Witch 13th in their "100 best Marvel characters" list.
 In 2022, Newasrama ranked the Scarlet Witch 12th in their "Best female superheroes" list.
 In 2023, CBR.com ranked the Scarlet Witch 3rd in their "10 Most Fashionable Marvel Heroes" list and 10th in their "10 Most Popular Marvel Characters" list.

Literary reception

Volumes 
In March 2021, Marvel Comics announced that Scarlet Witch: The Complete Collection, Vision & Scarlet Witch: The Saga of Wanda and Vision, House of M, and Vision: The Complete Collection sold out. In June 2021, Marvel Comics announced that multiple comic books starring the Scarlet Witch sold out.

The Vision & The Scarlet Witch - 1982 
Max Nason of CBR.com wrote, "Easily the most essential read for anyone getting ready for WandaVision is the two-volume limited series from writers Bill Mantlo (Volume 1) and Steve Englehart (Volume 2) simply titled The Vision and the Scarlet Witch. After their wedding in Giant-Size Avengers #4, these two series help expand and explore the relationship between the two heroes. Both volumes are equally as essential for understanding the characters as individuals as they are for understanding them as a married couple. The series both explore some of Wanda Maximoff's most notable storylines including her relationship with her father as well as her journey into motherhood. If there is any comic to consider reading in order to help better understand what you'll see in WandaVision, it has to be this classic title series for one of Marvel's most complex couples." Darby Harn of Screen Rant included The Vision And The Scarlet Witch (Vol.2) #12 in their "10 Best Scarlet Witch Comics Ever" list, asserting, "The Vision And The Scarlet Witch (vol. 2) #12 is the final issue of the 1985 mini-series and one of the most important in the history of the Scarlet Witch. She gives birth to Billy and Tommy in this issue after a difficult birth. It's a joyous occasion for her and The Vision, who have retired from the Avengers and live in the suburbs in relative normality. This series had a major influence on the storyline of WandaVision."

Avengers Origins: Scarlet Witch and Quicksilver - 2011 
According to Diamond Comic Distributors, Avengers Origins: Scarlet Witch and Quicksilver #1 was the 148th best selling comic book in November 2011.

Peyton Hinckle of ComicsVerse said, "Origin stories make superheroes. They tell us about a character’s motivations, dreams, and memories. They’re the perfect insight into why a character becomes a hero (or a villain). As readers, we need origin stories to understand the heroes we love. For a long time, Scarlet Witch and her brother Quicksilver had a half-formulated backstory. At first, they were just members of Magneto’s brotherhood. But, eventually, they realized that they were also Magneto’s children. The older comics don’t give us an up-close look at Wanda’s childhood, so in 2011 writer Sean McKeever tackled retelling Wanda and Pietro’s story in a modern climate. The result was Avengers Origins: Scarlet Witch and Quicksilver, which finally gave readers the origin story they wanted. If you want to read about Scarlet Witch, but have no idea where to start, this is the issue for you." George Marston of Newsarama ranked Avengers Origins: Scarlet Witch and Quicksilver 6th in their "The best Wanda Maximoff / Scarlet Witch stories of all time" list, asserting, "In comic books, Wanda and Pietro's time as villains was short-lived, and their prior history wasn't largely explored until years later, through glimpses and scattered stories. But 2011's Avengers Origins: Scarlet Witch & Quicksilver takes a deeper dive into the histories of the titular heroes, showing their past and the lead-up to their time with the Brotherhood of Evil Mutants in a way that wasn't previously told on the page. Wanda and Pietro's history is one of the most unlikely backbones of the Marvel Universe, with their simple origins growing from a throughline between the X-Men and Avengers to the saga of a family tree that has branches throughout Marvel Comics, and Avengers Origins: Scarlet Witch & Quicksilver presents a concise and engaging take on their earliest days."

Scarlet Witch - 2015 
According to Diamond Comic Distributors, Scarlet Witch #1 was the 29th best selling comic book in December 2015. Scarlet Witch #1 was the 278th best selling comic book in 2015.

Beat Staff of ComicsVerse called Scarlet Witch #1 "bewitching," saying, "The real gems of the comic are the art of Vanesa Del Rey and the coloring of Jordie Bellaire. The way the lines blend with the color shows the painstaking care that the artist and colorist took. The art is so strong though that I feel much of the heavy, one-sided explanation made through the dialogue could have been done away with. The scenes and the comic as a whole look as if it were a painting, inspired by the colors and style of the early comics (in a good way), but yet with a dash of Dave McKean. Look at an issue of Sandman by Neil Gaiman and Dave McKean. The dialogue and art flow so well together, but if you took away the text you could still understand what was going on in the story. The art can carry the brunt of the weight if need be. The dialogue is a little heavy in anything Neil Gaiman writes, but heavy in a good way. [...] Overall, I did enjoy Scarlet Witch. The art was refreshing in a market that requires a comic to stand out from the rest. The dialogue was a little tedious, but again it’s a first issue. I would love to see the introduction of other characters to act as catalysts with the Scarlet Witch. If they build on the look of the comic and tune up the text a bit, James Robinson’s Scarlet Witch will do fine." Chase Magnett of Comicbook.com gave Scarlet Witch #1 a grade of B, writing, "The beautiful thing about Scarlet Witch #1 is that it utilizes a long established character with nothing that even resembles an iconic interpretation. Much like the beginning of Matt Fraction and David Aja's run on Hawkeye (a character shown in the very first page of Scarlet Witch #1) there's no sacred burial ground that writer James Robinson and artist Vanesa Del Rey must fear treading upon. Instead they are capable of crafting their own mythos and reshaping their main character into the best form for their story. It's something they do well in this first issue, providing an intriguing, if flawed, initial take on this classic Avenger. [...] Scarlet Witch #1 is a comic with a lot of promise. It's premise and creative team deliver a solid first issue, albeit one that could have used a more challenging editorial hand. Wanda Maximoff's voice has never been stronger though, and as long as the depiction of her adventures remains this compelling, it will be worthwhile seeing where she goes next." Abhirup Sengupta of Sportskeeda called the Scarlet Witch comic book series one of the "5 best comic storylines featuring Scarlet Witch’s true extent of powers," stating, "The comic run featuring one of Wanda Maximoff’s best solo series was written by James Robinson. This run has become one of the most definitive character studies for the Scarlet Witch and follows the witch in a journey of self-discovery. It follows Wanda, who wants to repair her magical powers and travels throughout the globe. The series by Robinson serves as the best starter comic for Scarlet Witch fans. According to multiple fan polls in Reddit, this comic has been deemed the best run to explore Scarlet Witch."

Scarlet Witch - 2023 
According to the online trade magazine ICv2, Scarlet Witch #1 was the 3rd best selling comic book in January 2023.

Rebecca Oliver Kaplan of ComicsBeat called Scarlet Witch #1 a "solid start to Scarlet Witch’s first solo series in a while," asserting, "In Scarlet Witch #1, Orlando and Pichelli pull from continuity old and new to weave a tale that is both full of continuity while simultaneously transcending its historically characteristic limitations. This inaugural issue represents the foundation for an intricate, well-woven tapestry… and hopefully one that will run more than 6 or 12 issues." Jenna Anderson of Comicbook.com gave Scarlet Witch #1 a grade of 5 out of 5, saying, "From the second this Scarlet Witch series was first announced, it was clear that it would be something distinct – not only Wanda's first (well-deserved) solo book in nearly a decade, but the first title to reckon with how she has been interpreted on the big screen. The team of Steve Orlando, Sara Pichelli, and company take that task and have fun with it, crafting a timeless and spellbinding look at Wanda's new status quo. It's an understatement to say that Wanda has a legacy—on the page, screen, and otherwise—like no other, and Scarlet Witch #1 is an excellent addition to that."

Other versions

Age of Apocalypse
Age of Apocalypse was a comic book event where reality was altered by time travel, causing the death of X-Men founder Charles Xavier ten years before the formation of the X-Men. This causes a domino effect that leads to the mutant Apocalypse devastating much of the world and ruling the United States' remnants while Magneto leads a rebel force that he named the X-Men in honor of his dead friend. In this reality, Magneto finds Wanda and Pietro years earlier and concludes they are his children, allowing him the chance to raise them for part of their lives. Years later, the two are among his first X-Men recruits. While the team is based on Wundagore Mountain in Transia, Wanda welcomes new recruit Rogue. However, the team is attacked by Apocalypse and his troops and Wanda dies fighting Apocalypse's son Nemesis. As a last request, she asks Rogue to stay close to her father and protect him. Rogue takes the request seriously, eventually entering a romantic relationship with Magneto.

In the tie-in comic Uncanny X-Force, Jean Grey has Wanda cloned and animates her to replicate the events of House of M. However, the spell only affects Grey and Sabretooth.

Heroes Reborn (1996)
Following the defeat of the entity Onslaught, Wanda lived a new version of her life in an alternate reality depicted in the 1996 Heroes Reborn miniseries. In this reality, there is no evidence mutants exist and Wanda is a human sorcerer raised by Agatha Harkness, who trains her in magic. The former goes on to become a founding member of the Avengers, with Agatha remaining close by.

Heroes Reborn (2021)
In an alternate reality depicted in the 2021 Heroes Reborn miniseries, the Scarlet Witch becomes the Speedster Supreme, Silver Witch, after Quicksilver was killed in battle against the Squadron Supreme of America, which caused her chaos magic to absorb her brother's powers. She would later go on to join the Masters of Doom and race the Blur, only to be defeated by him and remanded to Ravencroft Asylum.

Infinity Wars
During the events of the miniseries Infinity Wars, the universe is folded in half, which results in the Scarlet Witch being fused with X-23 to create Laura, aka "Weapon Hex". In this reality, she was created by the Evolutionaries, a group who sought to use science and sorcery to experiment on mutants and create a vessel for the demon Mephicton (a fusion of Mephisto and Chthon) after several failures and the deaths of many mutants, Sarah Kinney and Herbert Wyndham conceive a flawed child, Laura, to serve as the vessel. While raising Laura, Kinney taught her empathy and humanity while Wyndham wanted his daughter to become a weapon. After turning 17, Laura and Hellhound (a fusion of Magik and Sabretooth) are sent on missions for the Evolutionaries. Following her mother's death, Laura discovers she has a younger sister named Gavrill (a fusion of Quicksilver and Honey Badger) and tries to escape, only to be killed by Hellhound while Wyndham uses Gavrill as the Evolutionaries' vessel. However, Laura heals and kills Wyndham and Hellhound before leaving with Gavrill.

Marvel 1602
In Marvel 1602, the Marvel timeline is reset so that many superheroes and villains emerge during the early 17th century. In this version of events, mutants exist, but are known as "witchbreed". Wanda and her brother Petros are both followers of Enrique, who hides his true power and acts as the High Inquisitor of the Spanish Catholic Church.

Marvel Noir
In the limited series X-Men Noir, Wanda Magnus is a wealthy socialite during the 1930s and the daughter of Chief of Detectives Eric Magnus.

Marvel Zombies
In the Marvel Zombies miniseries, an alternate universe version of Scarlet Witch helps Ash Williams find the Necronomicon Ex-Mortis. However, Wanda is eventually attacked and infected by zombified vigilante, the Punisher. Her zombie form appears in Marvel Zombies 3, working with the Kingpin and using the Vision to block enemy radio signals as necessary. She and the other zombies are later confronted by Machine Man and Jocasta, who save the Vision and kill the zombie Kingpin and Scarlet Witch.

MC2
An older version of Scarlet Witch appears in a possible future reality depicted in the MC2 imprint series, A-Next. She was placed in a coma following the original Avengers' final battle. However, Loki captures, revives, and brainwashes her as part of his plan to corrupt various heroes and make them punish the Avengers. Despite this, she eventually regains her mind.

Ultimate Marvel
In the Ultimate Marvel imprint title Ultimates, the cynical and violent Scarlet Witch and her brother Quicksilver are raised by Magneto and recruited to be soldiers in his Brotherhood of Mutant Supremacy. In secret, the twins share an incestuous relationship before eventually leaving the Brotherhood to join the superhero team, the Ultimates, in exchange for the imprisoned Brotherhood members' release.

In the series Ultimates 3, Doctor Doom arranges the assassination of the Scarlet Witch via Ultron.

The Ultimate version of Wanda cannot cast hexes until she first calculates the mathematical probability of the effects she wishes to create; the more complex the effect, the more complex the math.

In other media

Television

 The Scarlet Witch appears in the "Captain America" segment of The Marvel Super Heroes, voiced by Peg Dixon.
 The Scarlet Witch appears in the X-Men episode "Family Ties", voiced by Susan Roman.
 The Scarlet Witch appears in Iron Man, voiced by Katherine Moffat in the first season and Jennifer Darling in the second. This version is a member of Force Works.
 The Scarlet Witch appears in The Avengers: United They Stand, voiced by Stavroula Logothettis. This version is a member of the Avengers.
 Wanda Maximoff appears in X-Men: Evolution, voiced by Kelly Sheridan. This version's design was influenced by goth fashion. Introduced in season two, she joins the Brotherhood of Bayville before eventually defecting to the X-Men in the series finale. In a vision of the future that Professor X has, she goes on to join S.H.I.E.L.D.
 The Scarlet Witch appears in Wolverine and the X-Men, voiced by Kate Higgins. This version is a member of Magneto's Acolytes and develops an interest in Nightcrawler.
 The Scarlet Witch appears in The Super Hero Squad Show, voiced by Tara Strong. Introduced in the season one episode "Hexed, Vexed, and Perplexed!", she and her brother Quicksilver were brought up by their father Magneto to become supervillains like him. However, Scarlet Witch and Quicksilver befriend the Falcon and turn against their father. In season two, the Scarlet Witch joins the Super Hero Squad.
 An alternate universe version of the Scarlet Witch who became a global dictator appears in the episode "Days, Nights, and Weekends of Future Past! (Six Against Infinity, Part 2)".

Film
 Marvel licensed the filming rights of the X-Men and related concepts, such as mutants, to 20th Century Fox, who created a film series based on the franchise. Years later, Marvel started their own film franchise, known as the Marvel Cinematic Universe (MCU), which focused on characters that they had not licensed to other studios (see below). At the time, the rights to Quicksilver and Scarlet Witch were disputed by both studios. As they both held the rights to the characters, with Fox citing the characters' mutant status and being children of Magneto and Marvel citing the twins' editorial history being more closely tied to the Avengers rather than the X-Men, the studios made an agreement wherein both of them could use the characters on the condition that the plots did not make reference to the other studio's properties (i.e. the Fox films could not mention the twins as members of the Avengers while the MCU could not mention them as mutants or children of Magneto). The arrangement became moot following the acquisition of 21st Century Fox by Disney – the parent company of Marvel Studios, and the confirmation that future X-Men films will take place within the MCU.
 A little girl appears alongside Peter Maximoff in X-Men: Days of Future Past, with a deleted scene implying she is Wanda in addition to the presence of another unseen sibling. Director Bryan Singer denied the girl is Wanda, saying she is a nameless little sister character who was created to be a nod for comic book fans. Additionally, the film has Peter remark that his father has magnetic abilities, but does not confirm that this is Magneto or clarify whether Peter's other siblings share the same father. In the sequel X-Men: Apocalypse, Peter is confirmed to be Magneto's son and has a half-sister named Nina, who Magneto raised in Europe.

Marvel Cinematic Universe

Wanda Maximoff / Scarlet Witch appears in media set in the Marvel Cinematic Universe, portrayed by Elizabeth Olsen. Wanda first appears in the mid-credits scene of the live-action film Captain America: The Winter Soldier (2014), before making subsequent appearances in the live-action films Avengers: Age of Ultron (2015), Captain America: Civil War (2016), Avengers: Infinity War (2018), Avengers: Endgame (2019), and Doctor Strange in the Multiverse of Madness (2022) as well as the live-action Disney+ miniseries WandaVision. Additionally, alternate timeline versions of Maximoff appear in the Disney+ animated series What If...? and Multiverse of Madness.

Video games
 The Scarlet Witch appears as a statue in Thanos's stage in Marvel Super Heroes.
 The Scarlet Witch appears as a playable character in X-Men Legends II: Rise of Apocalypse, voiced by Jennifer Hale. This version is a member of Magneto's Brotherhood of Mutants, having joined to keep her father in check.
 The Scarlet Witch appears as an NPC in Spider-Man: Battle for New York.
 The Scarlet Witch appears as a playable character in Marvel Super Hero Squad: The Infinity Gauntlet, voiced again by Tara Strong.
 The Scarlet Witch appears as a playable character in Marvel Super Hero Squad Online.
 The Scarlet Witch appears as a playable character in Marvel Super Hero Squad: Comic Combat, voiced again by Tara Strong.
 The Scarlet Witch makes a cameo appearance in Doctor Strange's ending in Ultimate Marvel vs. Capcom 3.
 The Scarlet Witch appears as a playable character in Marvel: Avengers Alliance.
 The Scarlet Witch appears as a playable character in Marvel Avengers: Battle for Earth.
 The Scarlet Witch appears as a playable character in Marvel Heroes, voiced again by Kate Higgins.
 The Scarlet Witch appears as a playable character in Marvel Avengers Alliance Tactics.
 The Scarlet Witch appears as a playable character in Marvel Puzzle Quest.
 The Scarlet Witch appears as a playable character in Marvel: Contest of Champions.
 The Scarlet Witch appears as a playable character in Marvel: Future Fight.
 The Scarlet Witch appears as a playable character in Lego Marvel's Avengers, voiced by Elizabeth Olsen.
 The Scarlet Witch appears as a playable character in Marvel Ultimate Alliance 3: The Black Order, voiced again by Kate Higgins.
 The Scarlet Witch appears as a playable character in Marvel Super War.
 The Scarlet Witch appears as a playable character in Marvel Future Revolution.
 The Scarlet Witch appears in Marvel Snap.
 The Scarlet Witch appears as a playable character in Marvel's Midnight Suns, voiced by Emily O'Brien. This version is a former member of the titular Midnight Suns.

Miscellaneous 
 The Scarlet Witch appears in a Got Milk? commercial alongside the Avengers.
 The MCU incarnation of the Scarlet Witch appears as a meet and greet character at Disney California Adventure.

Collected editions
The Scarlet Witch's solo appearances have been collected in a number of trade paperbacks:

References

Bibliography

External links

 Scarlet Witch at Marvel.com
 
 UncannyXmen.net Spotlight on Scarlet Witch

 
Avengers (comics) characters
Characters created by Jack Kirby
Characters created by Stan Lee
Comics characters introduced in 1964
Female characters in film
Fictional characters who can manipulate probability
Fictional characters who can manipulate reality
Fictional characters who can manipulate time
Fictional characters with elemental and environmental abilities
Fictional characters with energy-manipulation abilities
Fictional characters with evocation or summoning abilities
Fictional hypnotists and indoctrinators
Fictional immigrants to the United States
Fictional Jewish women
Fictional Jews in comics
Fictional Serbian Jews
Fictional Serbian people
Jewish superheroes
Marvel Comics characters who can teleport
Marvel Comics characters who have mental powers
Marvel Comics characters who use magic
Marvel Comics female superheroes
Marvel Comics female supervillains
Marvel Comics mutants
Marvel Comics mutates
Marvel Comics telekinetics
Marvel Comics telepaths
Marvel Comics witches
Romani comics characters
Superhero film characters
Superheroes who are adopted
Twin characters in comics
X-Men supporting characters